Grossarl (Großarl) is a market town in the St. Johann im Pongau district in the state of Salzburg in western central Austria. The valley Grossarltal got its name from Grossarl.

Geography

Location 
It is divided in the districts (north to south) Au ( AMSL), Schied (860 m), Unterberg, Großarl (895 m) as well as Eben and Bach (900 m).

Politics

Local politics 
Mayor is Johann Rohrmoser (ÖVP), Vice Mayor is Johann Ganitzer (SPÖ).

Coat of arms 
Grossarl got its coat of arms in 1965. It is a green uprooted alder on white ground. The illustration of the alder accords to the old German name of the market town "Arla". In 1339, Grossarl was mentioned as the valley with "merern Arel", what means "many alders". The sign of the alder shows the big tree clearings in the valley from the 11th to the 13th century. It also shows the big meaning of the wood industry in the valley. Some people say that it is also a symbol for the attachment of the inhabitants to the valley and its leaves show many children which were born in Grossarl.

Economy and infrastructure 
Grossarl is a very touristic oriented market town. The number of guest beds is at about 4,500 and it has hotels and hostels in all categories. Very impressive is the high density of 4-star hotels. Because of the 40 alpine cottages, Grossarl is also called "the valley of alpine cottages", in German "Das Tal der Almen".

Over the years, many small and medium enterprises settled down in the valley and became important employers for citizens of Grossarl (carpenter, bricklayer and earth-moving companies, etc.)

Prominent people

Notable citizens 

 Edmund Entacher (* 30. September 1949 in Grossarl) General of the Austrian Armed Forces
 Anton Sauter (1800–1881), Botanist and Doctor, brother of Ferdinand Sauter, founder of the corporation of Salzburgs regional and cultural studies 
 Ignatius Rieder (1858 Grossarl-1934 Salzburg), 1918-1934 archbishop of Salzburg
 Alois Rohrmoser (1932 Grossarl-2005 Wagrain), founder of the factory Atomic Skis
 Wolfram Paulus (*1957), film director and scriptwriter

Personalities with connections to the village 
 Sepp Forcher (*17. December 1930 Rome), Austrian TV presenter, 1955-1959 host on the Berglandhaus in Grossarl

References

External links

Cities and towns in St. Johann im Pongau District